The Yamaha Vino 125 is a scooter introduced by Yamaha Motor Company in 2004 as a larger brother to the  Yamaha Vino/Vino Classic, replacing the Yamaha Riva 125 (XC125) scooter. Little has changed since the 2004 introduction of the Vino 125 with the exception of color choices.  Because of the engine size and top speed, in many US States, the Vino 125 requires a motorcycle license to legally operate. The Vino 125 has a relatively low seat height, making it popular among smaller riders. The motorcycle was sold until 2009 in the United States (and 2010 in Canada.)

The Vino 125 has an air-cooled  single-cylinder 4-stroke SOHC engine. The engine has a fan for supplemental cooling. It has a Mikuni BS carburetor with an auto-choke and carburetor heat device.  Emissions controls are a catalyzed muffler, AIR Injection system, and an evaporative fuel canister. The braking system is a  single disc front brake and a 110 mm drum rear brake.  The tires are 3.50x10.

The Vino has a very similar counterpart in Thailand, called Fino, which looks almost identical.

Gallery
The picture below is a Yamaha Vino 50  but is so similar to the Vino 125 that it is hard to tell.  The major difference is the overall width as well that the rear luggage rack is much more substantial in overall size on the Vino 125.  The Vino 125 also has a large, rear, hand holding rail.

References

External links
  archived from the original on May 17, 2012
 Review of the 2004 Vino 125
 Motorscooter Guide

Vino 125
Motor scooters
Motorcycles introduced in 2004